Marshfield Hills is a census-designated place (CDP) in the town of Marshfield in Plymouth County, Massachusetts, United States. The population was 2,356 at the 2010 census.  The historic center of the village has been designated a historic district and listed on the National Register of Historic Places.

Geography 
Marshfield Hills is located at  (42.144557, -70.729800).

According to the United States Census Bureau, the CDP has a total area of 12.7 km2 (4.9 mi2), of which 11.7 km2 (4.5 mi2) is land and 1.0 km2 (0.4 mi2) (7.94%) is water.

Demographics 

As of the census of 2000, there were 2,369 people, 841 households, and 687 families residing in the CDP. The population density was 202.4/km2 (524.2/mi2). There were 862 housing units at an average density of 73.6/km2 (190.7/mi2). The racial makeup of the CDP was 98.27% White, 0.34% African American, 0.25% Native American, 0.34% Asian, 0.21% from other races, and 0.59% from two or more races. 0.59% of the population were Hispanic or Latino of any race.

There were 841 households, out of which 39.2% had children under the age of 18 living with them, 73.0% were married couples living together, 6.4% had a female householder with no husband present, and 18.2% were non-families. 15.5% of all households were made up of individuals, and 7.1% had someone living alone who was 65 years of age or older. The average household size was 2.82 and the average family size was 3.16.

In the CDP, the population was spread out, with 26.8% under the age of 18, 5.0% from 18 to 24, 26.4% from 25 to 44, 30.0% from 45 to 64, and 11.8% who were 65 years of age or older. The median age was 41 years. For every 100 females, there were 98.4 males. For every 100 females age 18 and over, there were 94.5 males.

The median income for a household in the CDP was $162,197, and the median income for a family was $189,564. Males had a median income of $98,635 versus $82,225 for females. The per capita income for the CDP was $132,484. 0% of families and 0.3% of the population were below the poverty line, including 6.5% of those under the age of 18 and 14.0% of those 65 and older.

See also
 National Register of Historic Places listings in Plymouth County, Massachusetts

References

External links
 Town of Marshfield
 Marshfield Historical Society
 Ventress Memorial Library

Census-designated places in Plymouth County, Massachusetts
Census-designated places in Massachusetts
Historic districts in Plymouth County, Massachusetts
National Register of Historic Places in Plymouth County, Massachusetts
Marshfield, Massachusetts